The Coolidge–Rising House is a house in Spokane, Washington, United States. It was designed by John K. Dow, and built in 1906. It was the residence of Alfred Coolidge, a financier, until Henry Rising, a long-time editor of the Spokane Daily Chronicle, bought it in 1924.

References

External links

Spokane Register of Historic Places

National Register of Historic Places in Spokane, Washington
Houses completed in 1906
Buildings and structures in Spokane, Washington
Houses on the National Register of Historic Places in Washington (state)
Houses in Spokane County, Washington
1906 establishments in Washington (state)